Iron(III) nitrate, or ferric nitrate, is the name used for a series of inorganic compounds with the formula Fe(NO3)3.(H2O)n.  Most common is the nonahydrate Fe(NO3)3.(H2O)9.  The hydrates are all pale colored, water-soluble paramagnetic salts.

Hydrates
Iron(III) nitrate is deliquescent, and it is commonly found as the nonahydrate Fe(NO3)3·9H2O, which forms colourless to pale violet crystals.  This compound is the trinitrate salt of the aquo complex [Fe(H2O)6]3+.
Other hydrates ·x, include:

 tetrahydrate (x=4), more precisely triaqua dinitratoiron(III) nitrate monohydrate, has complex cations wherein Fe3+ is coordinated with two nitrate anions as bidentate ligands and three of the four water molecules, in a pentagonal bipyramid configuration with two water molecules at the poles.
 pentahydrate (x=5), more precisely penta-aqua nitratoiron(III) dinitrate, in which the Fe3+ ion is coordinated to five water molecules and a unidentate nitrate anion ligand in octahedral configuration.
 hexahydrate (x=6), more precisely hexaaquairon(III) trinitrate, where the Fe3+ ion is coordinated to six water molecules in octahedral configuration.

Reactions
Iron(III) nitrate is a useful precursor to other iron compounds because the nitrate is easily removed or decomposed.  It is for example, a standard precursor to potassium ferrate .

When dissolved, iron(III) nitrate forms yellow solutions.  When this solution is heated to near boiling, nitric acid evaporates and a solid precipitate of iron(III) oxide  appears. Another method for producing iron oxides from this nitrate salt  involves neutralizing its aqueous solutions.

Preparation
The compound can be prepared by treating iron metal powder with nitric acid, as summarized by the following idealized equation:

Applications
Ferric nitrate has no large scale applications. It is a catalyst for the synthesis of sodium amide from a solution of sodium in ammonia:
 2 NH3  +  2 Na  →  2 NaNH2  +  H2

Certain clays impregnated with ferric nitrate have been shown to be useful oxidants in organic synthesis.  For example, ferric nitrate on Montmorillonite—a reagent called Clayfen—has been employed for the oxidation of alcohols to aldehydes and thiols to disulfides.

Ferric nitrate solutions are used by jewelers and metalsmiths to etch silver and silver alloys.

References

Iron(III) compounds
Nitrates
Deliquescent substances
Oxidizing agents